Mount Marwick is a high peak in the Explorers Range of the Bowers Mountains, Antarctica. The mountain was named by the New Zealand Antarctic Place-Names Committee in 1982 after the late John Marwick, Chief Paleontologist with the New Zealand Geological Survey.

References

Mountains of Victoria Land
Pennell Coast